This is a list of administrative divisions whose names were officially changed at one or more points in history. It does not include gradual changes in spelling.

Argentina 

 Eva Perón → La Pampa (1955)
 Presidente Perón → Chaco (1955)

Australia

 Swan River Colony → Western Australia (1832)
 Van Diemen's Land → Tasmania (1856)
 North Australia → Northern Territory (1931)
 Central Australia → Northern Territory (1931)
 Federal Capital Territory → Australian Capital Territory (1938)

Brazil
 Guaporé → Rondônia (1946)
 Rio Branco → Roraima (1946)

Canada
 Newfoundland → Newfoundland and Labrador (2001)

Czechia 

 Budějovický kraj → Jihočeský kraj (2001)
 Jihlavský kraj → Vysočina (2001) → Kraj Vysočina (2011)
 Brněnský kraj → Jihomoravský kraj (2001)
 Ostravský kraj → Moravskoslezský kraj (2001)

Hong Kong 
 Castle Peak → Tuen Mun

India
 Madras State → Tamil Nadu (1969) 
 Mysore State → Karnataka (1973) 
 Orissa → Odisha (2009)

Indonesia
 Daerah Istimewa Aceh → Nanggroe Aceh Darussalam (2002) 
 Irian Jaya → Papua (2002) 
 Irian Jaya Barat → Papua Barat (2007)
 Nanggroe Aceh Darussalam → Aceh (2009)

Ireland
King's County → County Offaly (1922)
Queen's County → County Laois (1922)
County Donegal → County Tirconaill (1922) → County Donegal (1927)

Kazakhstan 
 South Kazakhstan Region → Turkistan Region (2018)

Mozambique 
 Lourenço Marques Province → Maputo Province (1976)
 Moçambique Province → Nampula Province (1975)

Pakistan
North-West Frontier Province → Khyber Pakhtunkhwa (2010)

Serbia
Autonomous Province of Vojvodina (1944–1968) → Socialist Autonomous Province of Vojvodina (1968–1990)
Autonomous Region of Kosovo and Metohija (1945–1963) → Autonomous Province of Kosovo and Metohija (1963–1968) → Socialist Autonomous Province of Kosovo (1968–1990) → Autonomous Province of Kosovo and Metohija (1990–present)

South Africa

 Natal → KwaZulu/Natal (27 April 1994) → KwaZulu-Natal (4 February 1997)
 Pretoria-Witwatersrand-Vereeniging → Gauteng (3 July 1995)
 Orange Free State → Free State (3 July 1995)
 Eastern Transvaal  → Mpumalanga (20 September 1995)
 Northern Transvaal → Northern Province (20 September 1995) → Limpopo (11 July 2003)
 North-West → North West (4 February 1997)

South Korea
Sabi → Soburi → Buyeo
Tamra → Cheju → Jeju

Thailand 
 Khukhan province → Sisaket province (1938)
 Krung Kao province → Phra Nakhon Si Ayutthaya province (1919)
 Sawankhalok province → Sukhothai province (1939)

United States
Rhode Island and Providence Plantations → Rhode Island (30 November 2020)

References

See also 
 List of city name changes

Lists of place names
Alternative place names
Geographical renaming